Guillaume Florent (born October 13, 1973 in Dunkirk, France) is a French sailor and Olympic athlete who won a bronze medal at the 2008 Summer Olympics.

External links
 Bio on results.beijing2008.cn

Living people
1973 births
Sportspeople from Dunkirk
French male sailors (sport)
Olympic sailors of France
Sailors at the 1996 Summer Olympics – Laser
Sailors at the 2004 Summer Olympics – Finn
Sailors at the 2008 Summer Olympics – Finn
Olympic bronze medalists for France
Olympic medalists in sailing
Medalists at the 2008 Summer Olympics
21st-century French people